Significant events in computing include events relating directly or indirectly to software, hardware and wetware.

Currently mostly excluded are:
 events in general robotics
 events about uses of computational tools in biotechnology and similar fields (except for improvements to the underlying computational tools) as well as events in media-psychology except when those are directly linked to computational tools
Currently excluded are:
 events in computer insecurity/hacking incidents/breaches/Internet conflicts/malware if they aren't also about milestones towards computer security
 events about quantum computing and communication
 economic events and events of new technology policy beyond standardization

2023

Software-hardware systems

Software

AI software
The AI makes use of comprehension-, recall of knowledge-, and medical reasoning-algorithms but remains inferior to clinicians. As of 2023, humans often – if not most often – conduct query-based web searches, read websites and/or conduct physical doctor's visits to inquire health information, despite various difficulties, partly as they typically did not undergo any formal training in media literacy, digital literacy or health literacy, as such is not part of schools curricula in most education systems as of 2023.
A novel potentially significantly more efficient text-to-image approach, as implemented in MUSE, is reported.
A first successful autonomous long-duration operation, including simulated combat, of a modified F-16 fighter jet, X-62A, by two AI software is reported.
A text-to-speech synthesizer, VALL-E, that can be trained to mimic anybody's voice with just three seconds of voice data and may produce the most natural-sounding results to date is reported in a preprint.
A use of world models for a wide range of domains that makes decisions using e.g. different 3D worlds and reward frequencies and outperforms previous approaches, DreamerV3, is reported as a step towards general artificial intelligence in a preprint.
A large language model, ProGen, that can generate functional protein sequences with a predictable function, with the input including tags specifying protein properties, is reported.
A deep-learning model, ZFDesign, for zinc finger design for any genomic target for gene- and epigenetic-editing is reported.
Software for generating 3D dynamic scenes (text-to-4D), is reported.
A study reports the development of deep learning algorithms to identify technosignature candidates, finding 8 potential alien signals not detected earlier.
Chatbot and text-generating AI, ChatGPT (released on 30 Nov 22), a large language model, becomes highly popular, with some considering the large public's attention as unwarranted hype as potential applications are limited, similar software such as Cleverbot existed for many years, and the software is, on the fundamental level, not structured toward accuracy – e.g. providing seemingly credible but incorrect answers to queries and operating "without a contextual understanding of the language" – but only toward essentially the authenticity of mimicked human language. It was estimated that only two months after its launch, it had 100 million active users. Applications may include solving or supporting school writing assignments, malicious social bots (e.g. for misinformation, propaganda, and scams), and providing inspiration (e.g. for artistic writing or in design or ideation in general).

Hardware
Researchers demonstrate an open-brain surgery-free brain implant, Stentrode, that can record brain activity from a nearby blood vessel, showing it can be used to operate a computer.

2022

Software-hardware systems
The first laparoscopic surgery performed entirely by a robot is reported.

Researchers demonstrate semi-automated testing for reproducibility (which is lacking especially in cancer research) via extraction of statements about experimental results in, as of 2022 non-semantic, gene expression cancer research papers and subsequent testing with breast cancer cell lines via robot scientist "Eve". 
Agilicious, an open-source and open-hardware versatile standardized quadrotor drone, currently tailored toward agility, is released. 
A university reports the release of 'Quad-SDK' which may be the first open source full-stack software for large agile four-legged robots, compatible with the ROS.

 News outlets report about deployment, research and development of novel military drone technology in the Russo-Ukrainian War in 2022, including demining drones, self-repurposed commercial/hobby drones (including via a hackathon), reconnaissance microdrones, kamikaze drones, bomb-dropping modified drones, and countermeasures such as electronic ones.

The first data transmission to exceed 1 petabit per second (Pbit/s) using only a single laser and a single optical chip is demonstrated by European researchers.

 News outlets report about a novel agricultural robot for viable weed control using lasers or "laserweeding". There are similar precision agriculture machines that have been reported before, also e.g. applying low amounts of herbicides and fertilizers with precision while mapping plant locations, in some cases autonomously. Their benefits may include "healthier crops and soil, decreased herbicide use, and reduced chemical and labor costs".

A satellite-free GPS-alternative higher-resolution positioning system using existing telecommunications networks is demonstrated, SuperGPS.

Impossible Metals announces its first underwater robotic vehicle, 'Eureka 1', has completed its first trial of selectively harvesting polymetallic nodule rocks from the seabed nearly without harming the environment (as with other seabed mining) to help address the rising global need for metals for renewable energy system components – mainly batteries. It operates autonomously and uses advanced computer vision, e.g. using AI to determine which rocks have signs of visible life on them so that they are not harvested.

Software
A report by the Royal Society lists potential or proposed countermeasures against misinformation, mainly online misinformation, such as, broadly described, building resilience to scientific misinformation and a healthy online information environment. 

Computational biologists report the largest detailed human genetic genealogy, unifying human genomes from many sources for insights about human history, ancestry and evolution.

Researchers report the creation of a version control system for cell engineering, suggesting it to be a "significant step toward more open, reproducible, easier to trace and share, and more trustworthy engineering biology", and possibly increase safety by enabling faster tracing of organisms lab of origin and design details via barcoding.

A preprint demonstrates how backdoors can be placed undetectably into classifying (e.g. posts as "spam" or well-visible "not spam") machine learning models which are often developed and/or trained by third parties. Parties can change the classification of any input, including in cases with types of data/software transparency, possibly including white-box access. 
Researchers report routes for recycling 200 industrial waste chemicals into important drugs and agrochemicals using a software for computer-aided chemical synthesis design, helping enable "circular chemistry" as a potential area of a circular economy. 
The first global, interactive AI- and satellite monitoring-based, map and analysis of plastic waste sites to help prevention of plastic pollution, especially ocean pollution is published. 

A study suggests that in children at age 8–12 during two years, time gaming or watching digital videos can be positively correlated with measures intelligence, albeit correlations with overall screen time (including social media, socializing and TV) were not investigated and 'time gaming' did not differentiate between categories of video games (e.g. shares of games' platform and genre). 
Computing and the 2022 Russian invasion of Ukraine:An editorial published in a journal notes that remote surgery and types of videoconferencing for sharing expertise (e.g. ad hoc assistance) have been and could be used to support doctors in Ukraine. A forum contribution analyzes Russian users' reactions to the Bucha massacre on social media – on nationalist Telegram channels. Computer science and technology is also used to defend against the 2022 Russian invasion such as with military technology, to document and communicate war events including via facial recognition of dead Russian soldiers and Russian war crimes, and for aggregated information about support opportunities for Ukrainian scientists. 
Researchers demonstrate a MRI-ML-based approach that can diagnose early Alzheimer's disease  and may help identify unknown related changes in the brain. 
A study explores the efficacy of GitHub Sponsors, launched in 2019, in terms of supporting FOSS-efforts and the sponsors' intentions as well as the motivation of sponsors and various quantitative and qualitative analyses relevant to this approach of FOSS-funding.

Progress in climate change mitigation (CCM) living review-like works:The living document-like aggregation, assessment, integration and review website Project Drawdown adds 11 new CCM solutions to its organized set of mitigation techniques. The website's modeling framework is used in a study document to show that metal recycling has significant potential for CCM. A revised or updated version, using computer models, of a major worldwide 100% renewable energy proposed plan and model is published. 

Researchers report the development of a deep learning system that learns intuitive physics from visual data (of virtual 3D environments) to some degree "from scratch" based on an unpublished approach inspired by studies of visual cognition in infants. Two weeks later, other researchers report the development of a machine learning algorithm that could discover sets of basic variables of various physical systems and predict the systems' future dynamics from video recordings of their behavior. 
Researchers report the development of deep learning software that can design proteins that contain prespecified functional sites. 
DeepMind announces that its AlphaFold program has uncovered the structures of more than 200 million folded proteins, essentially all of those known to science. 

A screening AI system for many cancer types that integrates different types of data via multimodal learning is reported. 

News outlets report that in July, for the first time, more people watched streaming TV than cable within the U.S..

A researcher reports that the social media app TikTok adds a keylogger to its, on iOS essentially unavoidable, in-app browser in iOS, which allows its Chinese company to gather, for example, passwords, credit card details, and everything else that is typed into websites opened from taps on any external links within the app. Shortly after the report, the company claims such capabilities are only used for debugging-types of purposes. To date, it has largely not been investigated which and to which extent (other) apps have capacities for such or similar data-collection.

A university reports the development of a driver isolation framework to protect operating system kernels, primarily the monolithic Linux kernel which gets ~80,000 commits/year to its drivers, from defects and vulnerabilities in device drivers, with the Mars Research Group developers describing this lack of isolation as one of the main factors undermining kernel security.
A study concludes that advanced artificial intelligence with learned goal planning would or may intervene in the provision of reward to short-circuit reward via advanced exploits of ambiguity in the data about its goal such as considering the sending of the reward itself as humans' goal and intervening in the data-provision about its goal.

News outlets report artificial intelligence art has won the first place in a digital art competition. Such artistic imagery is generated using input consisting of text and sometimes images, usually including parameters such as artistic style (text-to-image generation). Around the time, an expert concludes that "AI art is everywhere right now", with even experts not knowing what it will mean, a news outlet establishes that "AI-generated art booms" and reports about issues of copyright and automation of professional artists, a news outlet investigates how online communities (e.g. their rules) confronted with many such artworks react, a news outlets raised concerns over deepfakes, a magazine highlights possibilities of enabling "new forms of artistic expression", an editorial notes that it may be seen as a welcome . Moreover, additional functionalities – such as enabling the use of user-provided concepts (like an object or a style) learned from few images for novel personalized art generated from the associated word/s or expanding beyond the borders of artistic images in the same style – are reported. On 22 August, Stable Diffusion is released as open source software, making the technology much more accessible and free to use on personal hardware as well as extendable by third-parties (i.e. other software projects).

A new deep learning technique enables year-round measurements of sea ice thickness in the Arctic.
The second largest cryptocurrency, Ethereum, switches from the proof-of-work (electricity consumption for validation) to the proof-of-stake (staked holdings for validation) algorithm, which cuts its large respective electricity consumption.
 Results of investigations about the issue of recommendation systems shifting their users' preferences "so they are easier to satisfy" are reported, including for actively optimizing such software to avoid problematic shifts/manipulation, suggesting "that recommenders that optimize for staying in the trust region can avoid manipulative behaviors while still generating engagement".

 An open source platform to match genomically profiled cancer patients to precision medicine drug trials is reported.

After domain seizures of Z-Library by copyright law enforcement and moves toward dark web and IPFS technologies by its content providers, the open source shadow library UI Anna's Archive – which also provides access to a full copy of Z-Library content and scientific articles – is established by a team of archivists, essentially providing the largest human book and literature library.

News outlets report about the development of a post-editing model using GPT-3 that improves machine translations after identification of current translation problems.

The largest global inventory and interactive map of greenhouse gas emission sources is released by Climate TRACE (9 Nov).

Around the acquisition of Twitter by Elon Musk (27 Oct), interest in alternatives to the site – described as "one of the world's most high-profile information ecosystems", a contemporary suboptimal public square, and as heavily used by many journalists and news media – increases substantially. However, no alternative such as Mastodon, Reddit or the Bluesky protocol was found to match  such as ease of use to date, in terms of being able to substitute the site.

Two studies demonstrate platform-built-in as well browser-integrated misinformation mitigation.

Researchers develop falsity scores for over 800 contemporary elites on Twitter and associated exposure scores.

News outlets report about the first fully self-supervised anti-money laundering AI software using contemporary suboptimal datasets, LaundroGraph.

A university reports on the first study of the new privacy-intrusion Web tracking technique of "UID smuggling" by the ad industry, which finds it to be prevalent and largely not mitigated by latest protection tools – such as Firefox's tracking protection and uBlock Origin – and contributes to countermeasures.

Text-to-3D software becomes sophisticated, shortly after generative AI art. OpenAI releases Point-E, a machine learning system that can generate 3D models from text prompts, similar to previously released GET3D and Magic3D by Nvidia. DreamFusion from Google may also be notable.

Hardware

A logic gate for computation at femtosecond timescales is demonstrated.
A study estimates losses of 61 metals to help the development of circular economy strategies, showing that usespans of, often scarce, tech-critical metals are short. 
  Researchers report a robotic finger covered in a type of manufactured living human skin. Researchers demonstrate an electronic skin giving biological skin-like haptic sensations and touch/pain-sensitivity to a robotic hand. A system of an electronic skin and a human-machine interface is reported that can enable remote sensed tactile perception, and wearable or robotic sensing of many hazardous substances and pathogens. A multilayer tactile sensor hydrogel-based robot skin is demonstrated. 
 Samsung announces the first mass production of computer chips using a 3 nm process. These feature a gate-all-around transistor architecture that reduces power consumption by up to 45%, improves performance by 23% and reduces area by 16% compared to 5 nm.

Researchers report the development of nanoscale brain-inspired artificial synapses, using the ion proton, for 'analog deep learning'. 

The creation of artificial neurons that can receive and release dopamine (chemical signals rather than electrical signals) and communicate with natural rat muscle and brain cells is reported, with potential for use in BCIs/prosthetics.

Scientists report a so far unique and unknown feature of material VO2 – it can "remember" previous external stimuli (via structural rather than electronic states), with potential for e.g. data storage.

 Researchers report the development of remote controlled cyborg cockroaches  if moving to sunlight for recharging.

Researchers from the Max Planck Institute for Polymer Research reported an organic artificial spiking neuron for in-situ sensing and biointerface that exhibits the signal diversity of biological neurons.

2021 

 [Meta/Policy/Philosophy] – Thomas Metzinger, a German philosopher of cognitive science and applied ethics, calls for a "global moratorium on synthetic phenomenology" which, "until 2050", precautionarily bans "all research that directly aims at or knowingly risks the emergence of artificial consciousness on post-biotic carrier systems" – and could be gradually refined. The paper does not describe mechanisms of global enforcement of such proposed regulations which do not consider biotic or semi-biotic systems and aims to limit suffering risks.
 [Type of database] – A new global food emissions database indicates that the current food systems are responsible for one third of the global anthropogenic greenhouse gas emissions.
 [Data usage] – In a static proprietary article that appeared in and was co-reviewed by a scientific journal, authenticated scientists analyze data from multiple public databases to create a regional representation of levels of deforestation induced by nations' recent, largely unmodulated, trade-, production- and consumption-patterns.

 A study finds that carbon emissions from Bitcoin mining in China – where a majority of the proof-of-work algorithm that generates current economic value is computed, largely fueled by nonrenewable sources – have accelerated rapidly and would soon exceed total annual emissions of countries like Italy, interfering with climate change mitigation commitments.
 Neuralink reveals a male macaque with chips embedded on each side of its brain, playing a mind-controlled version of Pong. While similar technology has been demonstrated for decades, and wireless implants have existed for years, some observers note that the organization increased the number of implanted electrodes that are read wirelessly.

 Scientists review materials strategies for organic neuromorphic devices, suggesting that "their biocompatibility and mechanical conformability give them an advantage for creating adaptive biointerfaces, brain-machine interfaces, and biology-inspired prosthetics".

 Researchers publish the first in-depth study of Web browser tab interfaces. They found that many people struggle with tab overload and conducted surveys and interviews about people's tab use. Thereby they formalized pressures for closing tabs and for keeping tabs open. The authors then developed related UI design considerations which could enable better tools and changes to the code of Web browsers – like Firefox – that allow knowledge workers and other users to better manage their tabs.
 Operation of the U.S. Colonial Pipeline is interrupted by a ransomware cyber attack.
 A new record for the smallest single-chip system is achieved, occupying a total volume of less than 0.1 mm³.

 Scientists demonstrate the first brain–computer interface that decodes neural signals for handwriting. The character output speed of a patient with a paralyzed hand was up to 90 characters per minute – more than double the previous record. Each letter is associated with a highly distinctive pattern of activity in the brain, making it relatively easy for the algorithm to distinguish them.
 Archivists initiate a rescue mission to secure enduring access to humanity's largest public library of scientific articles, Sci-Hub, due to the site's increased legal troubles, using Web and BitTorrent technologies.
 Google demonstrates a research project called LaMDA, an automatic language generation system designed to sustain a conversation with a person on any topic.
 The most comprehensive 3D map of the human brain – of a millionth of a brain and requiring 1.4 petabytes of storage space – is published.
 El Salvador passes the Bitcoin Law, making the first country give cryptocurrency and bitcoin a status of legal tender. The law was passed by the Legislative Assembly of El Salvador on June 8, 2021, giving the cryptocurrency bitcoin the status of legal tender within El Salvador after September 7, 2021. It was proposed by President Nayib Bukele. The text of the law states that "the purpose of this law is to regulate bitcoin as unrestricted legal tender with liberating power, unlimited in any transaction, and to any title that public or private natural or legal persons require carrying out".
 GitHub Copilot, a programmer assistant AI, is released. Later FOSS variants of the tool include FauxPilot.

 In the debate the cognitive impacts of smartphones and digital technology a group reports that, contrary to widespread belief, scientific evidence doesn't show that these technologies harm biological cognitive abilities and that they instead change predominant ways of cognition – such as a reduced need to remember facts or conduct mathematical calculations by pen and paper outside contemporary schools. However, some activities – like reading novels – that require long attention-spans and don't feature ongoing rewarding stimulation may become more challenging in general.

 Open 3D Engine – a game engine that is free and open source software (FOSS) and has GNU/Linux support – is released.
 Researchers used a brain–computer interface to enable a man who was paralyzed since 2003 to produce comprehensible words and sentences by decoding signals from electrodes in the speech areas of his brain.
 Japan achieves a new world record Internet speed: 319 Tbit/s over ~3000 km which, albeit not being the fastest speed overall, beats the previous record of 178 Tbit/s.
 Scientists report that worldwide adolescent loneliness and depression increased substantially after 2012 and that loneliness in contemporary schools appears to be associated with smartphone access and Internet use.

 DeepMind announces that its AlphaFold AI has predicted the structures of over 350,000 proteins, including 98.5% of the ~20,000 proteins in the human body. The 3D data along with their degrees of confidence for accuracy is made freely available with a new database, doubling the previous number of protein structures in the public domain.
 Scientists publish the first complete neuron-level-resolution 3D map of a monkey brain which they scanned within 100 hours.

 A researcher reports that solar superstorms would cause large-scale global months-long Internet outages. She describes potential mitigation measures and exceptions – such as user-powered mesh networks and related peer-to-peer applications – and the robustness of the current Internet infrastructure. 

 Scientists conclude that personal carbon allowances (PCAs) could be a component of climate change mitigation. They find that the economic recovery from COVID-19 and novel digital technology capacities open a window of opportunity for first implementations. PCAs would consist of – e.g. monetary – credit-feedbacks and decreasing default levels of per capita emissions concessions. The researchers find that recent advances in machine learning technology and "smarter home and transport options make it possible to easily track and manage a large share of individuals' emissions" and that feedback effective in engaging individuals to reduce their energy-related emissions and relevant new personalized apps could be designed. Issues may include privacy, evaluating emissions from individuals co-running multinational companies and the availability and prices of products and services. 
 Cerebras announces a new hardware and software platform that can support AI models of 120 trillion parameters, enabling neural networks greater than the equivalent number of human brain synapses.
 Pathogen researchers report the development of machine learning models for genome-based early detection and prioritization of high-risk potential zoonotic viruses in animals prior to spillover to humans. They conclude that their tool could be used for virus surveillance for pandemic prevention via (i.a.) measures of "early investigation and outbreak preparedness" and would have been capable of predicting SARS-CoV-2 as a high-risk strain.
 A loss of public IP routes to the Facebook DNS servers due to malfunctioning capacity-assessment code, routinely triggered after configuration changes of routers of the company's data centers, that resulted in stoppage of BGP routing information broadcasts causes the 2021 Facebook outage.
 A study of data traffic by popular smartphones running variants of the Android software finds substantial by-default data collection and sharing with no opt-out (i.e. even the NetGuard firewall, which is not installed by default, may not reliably and completely prevent such data traffic) and implications for users' privacy, control and security.
 Media outlets report about novel technologies for virtual try-ons of clothes for more sustainable fashion and improved online shopping, which increased relative to shopping at local shops that store clothes due to the COVID-19 pandemic.
A method of DNA data storage with 100 times the density of previous techniques is announced.
 Scientists demonstrate that grown brain cells integrated into digital systems can carry out goal-directed tasks with performance-scores. In particular, playing a simulated (via electrophysiological stimulation) Pong which the cells learned to play faster than known machine intelligence systems, albeit to a lower skill-level than both AI and humans. Moreover, the study suggests it provides "first empirical evidence" of information-processing capacity differences between neurons from different species. 
Researchers reported the development of organic low-power neuromorphic electronics which they built into a robot, enabling it to learn sensorimotorically within the real world, rather than via simulations like in the study above. For the chip, polymers were used and coated with an ion-rich gel to enable the material to carry an electric charge like real neurons.
 Researchers report the development of a system of machine learning and hyperspectral camera that can distinguish between 12 different types of plastics such as PET and PP for automated separation of waste of, as of 2020, highly unstandardized plastics products and packaging. 
 A scientific review summarizes research and data about telemedicine. Its results indicate that, in general, outcomes of such ICT-use are as good as in-person care with health care use staying similar.
 The Log4Shell security vulnerability in a Java logging framework is publicly disclosed two weeks after its discovery. Because of the ubiquity of the affected software, experts have described it as a most serious computer vulnerability. In a high-level meeting, the importance of security maintenance of open-source software – often also carried out largely by few volunteers – to national security was clarified.

 Researchers report the development of a database and analysis tool about perovskite solar cells which systematically integrates over 15,000 publications, in particular device-data about over 42,400 of such photovoltaic devices. Authors described the site – which requires signing up to access the data and uses software that is partly open source but to date not free software – as a participative "Wikipedia for perovskite solar cell research" and suggest that extensively capturing the progress of an entire field including interactive data exploration functionalities could also be applicable to many fields in materials science, engineering and biosciences.
 A third main convergent graphical shell (Maui Shell) and UI framework (MauiKit), based on KDE/Kirigami, for the GNU/Linux operating system on smartphones, desktops and other devices, is released.

2020
 Scite.ai – a deep learning-based citation index that classifies scientific citations as 'Supporting', 'Mentioning' or 'Contrasting' the respective study (a type of semantic metadata) – is launched. 

 February 7 – AMD releases the Ryzen Threadripper 3990X, the first 64 core CPU for consumer market based on the Zen 2 microarchitecture.
 March 26 – After one of the first and largest public volunteer distributed computing projects SETI@home announced its shutdown by March 31, 2020, and due to heightened interest as a result of to the COVID-19 pandemic, the distributed computing project Folding@home becomes the world's first system to reach one exaFLOPS. The system simulates protein folding, is used for medical research on COVID-19 and achieved a speed of approximately 2.43 x86 exaFLOPS by April 13, 2020 many times faster than the fastest supercomputer Summit.
 April 20 – Researchers demonstrate a diffusive memristor fabricated from protein nanowires of the bacterium Geobacter sulfurreducens which functions at substantially lower voltages than previously described ones and may allow the construction of artificial neurons which function at voltages of biological action potentials. The nanowires have a range of advantages over silicon nanowires and the memristors may be used to directly process biosensing signals, for neuromorphic computing and/or direct communication with biological neurons.
 May 22 – Australian computer scientists report achieving, thus far, the highest internet speed in the world from a single optical chip source over standard optical fiber, amounting to 44.2 Terabits per sec, or "downloading 1000 high definition movies in a split second".
 May 27 – A study shows that social networks can function poorly as pathways for inconvenient truths, that the interplay between communication and action during disasters may depend on the structure of social networks, that communication networks suppress necessary "evacuations" in test-scenarios because of false reassurances when compared to groups of isolated individuals and that larger networks with a smaller proportion of informed subjects can suffer more damage due to human-caused misinformation. 

 June 11 – Chatbot-technology and text-producing AI GPT-3 is released. 
 July 6 – [Novel protocol/standard] – The Versatile Video Coding standard (H.266) is finalised, designed to halve the bitrate of previous formats, reducing data volume and being especially useful for on-demand 8K streaming services. 
 June 15 – Researchers report the development of a polymer device that can receive dopamine signals from real cells and learns from it.
 July 15 – A cyborg beetle with a camera is demonstrated. The  streams video to a smartphone via Bluetooth for a "bug's eye view". 
 August 28 – Elon Musk reveals a model of the prototype brain–computer interface chip, implanted in pigs, that his company Neuralink has been working on.
 September 3 – Scientists report finding "176 Open Access journals that, through lack of comprehensive and open archives, vanished from the Web between 2000–2019, spanning all major research disciplines and geographic regions of the world" and that in 2019 only about a third of the 14,068 DOAJ-indexed journals ensured the long-term preservation of their content themselves, with many papers not getting archived by Web archiving initiatives such as the Internet Archive. 

 September 18 – Media reports of what may be the first publicly confirmed case of a civilian fatality as a nearly direct consequence of a cyberattack, after ransomware disrupted a hospital in Germany.
 September 25 – [Novel application of computing / software] – Chemists describe, for the first time, possible chemical pathways from nonliving prebiotic chemicals to complex biochemicals that could give rise to living organisms, based on a new computer program named ALLCHEMY. 
 October 28 – A review suggests only surgical robot platforms "that can effectively communicate their intent and explain their decisions to their human companions will find their way into the operating room of the future", defines levels of autonomy and suggests "positive evidence will soon emerge and build up" that would motivate "transition to clinical trials".

Awards and challenges

Deaths

2023

2022
 January 2: Hagit Shatkay, 56, Israeli-American computer scientist.
 January 30: Takao Nishizeki, 74, Japanese mathematician and computer scientist.
 February 16: Lorinda Cherry, 77, American computer scientist and programmer.
 February 28: Mary Coombs, 93, British computer programmer.
 September 2: Peter Eckersley (computer scientist), 43, Australian computer scientist.

2021
January 2: Brad Cox, American computer scientist, and inventor of the Objective-C programming language (b. 1944)
January 28: Alice Recoque, French computer scientist (b. 1929)
February 1: Walter Savitch, American computer scientist and theoretical mathematician (b. 1943)
February 6: Ioan Dzițac, Romanian computer scientist and mathematician (b. 1953)
March 6: Lou Ottens, Dutch engineer and inventor of the cassette tape (b. 1926)
April 1: Isamu Akasaki, Japanese engineer and physicist, and inventor of the blue LED (b. 1929)
April 16: Charles Geschke, American computer scientist, and co-founder of Adobe Inc. (b. 1939)
April 23: Dan Kaminsky, American computer security researcher (b. 1979)
May 23: Makoto Nagao, Japanese natural language processing pioneer (b. 1936)
June 23: John McAfee, British-American antivirus software pioneer, and founder of McAfee (b. 1945)

2020
January 2: Robert M. Graham, American computer scientist (b. 1929)
January 3: Joseph Karr O'Connor, American computer scientist (b. 1953)
January 8: Peter T. Kirstein, British computer scientist (b. 1933)
February 11: Yasumasa Kanada, Japanese computer scientist (b. 1949)
February 16:
Larry Tesler, American computer scientist (b. 1945)
John Iliffe, British computer designer (b. 1931)
February 18: Bert Sutherland, American computer scientist (b. 1936)
March 2: Vera Pless, American mathematician (b. 1931)
March 15: Olvi L. Mangasarian, Iraqi-American computer scientist and mathematician (b. 1934)
April 7
Mishik Kazaryan, Russian physicist (b. 1948)
Adrian V. Stokes, British computer scientist (b. 1945)
April 11: John Horton Conway, British mathematician (b. 1937)
April 25: Thomas Huang, American computer scientist (b. 1936)
May 9: Timo Honkela, Finnish computer scientist (b. 1962)
June 5: Deborah Washington Brown, American computer scientist (b. 1952)
July 10: Michael M. Richter, German mathematician and computer scientist (b. 1938)
July 26: Bill English, American computer engineer and co-developer of the computer mouse (b. 1929)
August 4: Frances Allen, American computer scientist, first woman to win the Turing Award (b. 1932)
August 11: Russell Kirsch, American computer scientist and inventor of the first digital image scanner (b. 1929)
August 25: Rebeca Guber, Argentine mathematician and computer scientist (b.1926)
October 2: Victor Zalgaller, Russian-Israeli mathematician (b. 1920)
November 7: Chung Laung Liu, Taiwanese computer scientist (b. 1934)
November 14: Peter Pagé, German computer scientist (b. 1939)
November 23: Konrad Fiałkowski, Polish computer engineer (b. 1939)
December 1
Norman Abramson, American computer scientist and engineer (b. 1932)
Eric Engstrom, American software engineer and co-creator of DirectX (b. 1965)
December 14: Claudio Baiocchi, Italian mathematician (b. 1940)
December 22: Edmund M. Clarke, American computer scientist (b. 1945)
December 23: Lars Arge, Danish computer scientist (b. 1967)

Further topics
Very broad outlines of topic domains and topics with substantial progress during the decade not yet included above with a Further information: link:

Software
 Applications of artificial intelligence
 Explainable artificial intelligence
 Artificial intelligence art
 Climate change mitigation#Research
 Education#Development
 Archivist#On the Internet
 Decision-making software
 Emulator
 Video game console emulator
 Technical standard
 Supply chain sustainability#Software
 Sustainability standards and certification
 Linux for mobile devices
 Usage share of operating systems

COVID-19
 Impact of the COVID-19 pandemic on education
 Learning management system#COVID-19 and Learning Management Systems
 Impact of the COVID-19 pandemic on science and technology
 Software for COVID-19 pandemic mitigation

Economic events and economics
 2020–present global chip shortage
 Cryptocurrency bubble#2020–2022 cryptocurrency bubble
 Bug bounty program#Notable programs
 China–United States trade war#2020 or general technological sovereignty policies
General topics
 Business models for open-source software#FOSS and economy
 Digital transformation#History
 Distributive justice/Sustainable distribution/Sustainable design/Algorithms for resource allocation and sustainable food system decision-making
 2020s in economic history#Remote work

New releases

See also

References

2020
2020s in technology
 
2020s decade overviews
Computing